Mitrephora lanotan is a species of plant in the family Annonaceae. It is endemic to the Philippines.

References

Flora of the Philippines
lanotan
Vulnerable plants
Taxonomy articles created by Polbot
Taxa named by Francisco Manuel Blanco